Lê Chân is an urban district (quận) of Hai Phong, the third largest city of Vietnam.

Geography
Lê Chân is located at the center of Haiphong and is neighboured by the following districts:
 Ngo Quyền at the east,
 An Dương (through the Đào Hạ Lý river) and Kiến An at the west,
 Dương Kinh at the south with the Lạch Tray river as the southern border, and
 Hồng Bàng at the north.

History
Lê Chân was formerly the Lê Chân quarter of Haiphong and was established on 5 July 1961 on the basis of merging the Dư Hàng quarter with some other smaller areas belonging to the former Cầu Đất and Hàng Kênh quarters.

By 3 January 1981, the Lê Chân quarter was renamed to Lê Chân district and consisted of 11 wards: An Biên, An Dương, Cát Dài, Đông Hải, Dư Hàng, Hàng Kênh, Hồ Nam, Lam Sơn, Mê Linh, Niệm Nghĩa, and Trại Cau.

On 25 September 1981 the wards Lam Sơn and An Dương were divided into three wards: Lam Sơn, An Dương and Trần Nguyên Hãn.

On 20 December 2002 the two communes Dư Hàng Kênh and Vĩnh Niệm belonging to the former rural district An Hải were moved to the Lê Chân district for management and changed into wards with similar names.

On 10 January 2004 the Niệm Nghĩa ward was divided into 2 wards: Niệm Nghĩa and Nghĩa Xá. Also the Mê Linh ward was merged into the An Biên ward.

On 5 April 2007 the Dư Hàng Kênh ward was divided into 2 wards:  Dư Hàng Kênh and Kênh Dương.

Today Lê Chân has 15 wards: An Biên, An Dương, Cát Dài, Đông Hải, Dư Hàng, Dư Hàng Kênh, Hàng Kênh, Hồ Nam, Kênh Dương, Lam Sơn, Nghĩa Xá, Niệm Nghĩa, Trại Cau, Trần Nguyên Hãn, and Vĩnh Niệm.

Economy
Lê Chân has only a few areas for agriculture and cultivation and the size of natural land is decreasing. Even though it is no major economic, political or cultural center, Lê Chân is home to many facilities for industrial and handicraft production. The average GDP growth rate has been over many years a double-digit growth rate (25–31% per year).

Infrastructure
Nowadays Lê Chân is developing its investments for the construction of the Waterfront City urban area located at the territory of the Vĩnh Niệm ward.

Education
Lê Chân has a number of universities and colleges, e.g.:
 Vietnam Maritime University (Đại học Hàng hải Việt Nam)
 Haiphong Private University (Đại học Dân lập Hải Phòng)
 Haiphong University of Management and Technology (Đại học Quản lý và Công Nghệ Hải Phòng)
 Haiphong Medical College (Cao đẳng Y tế Hải Phòng)
 College of Technology, Economics and Fisheries (Cao đẳng nghề Công nghệ, Kinh tế và Thủy sản)

Healthcare
Some of the hospitals in Lê Chân are:
 Vietnamese-Czechoslovak Friendship Hospital (Bệnh viện Hữu Nghị Việt Tiệp)
 Haiphong International General Hospital (Bệnh viện Đa khoa quốc tế Hải Phòng)
 Haiphong Vinmec International General Hospital (Bệnh viện Đa khoa Quốc tế Vinmec Hải Phòng)
 Green International Hospital (Bệnh viện Quốc tế Green)

References

Districts of Haiphong